Lawrence Michael McKenna (November 7, 1933 – February 3, 2023) was a United States district judge of the United States District Court for the Southern District of New York.

Education and career
Lawrence Michael McKenna was born in Manhattan and was raised in Douglaston, Queens. graduated from Regis High School, then received an Artium Baccalaureus degree from Fordham College in 1956. He received a Bachelor of Laws from Columbia Law School in 1959. He was in private practice of law in New York City from 1959 to 1990, at the firm of Simpson Thacher & Bartlett from 1959 to 1969 and at the firm of Wormser, Kiely, Alessandroni, Hyde & McCann from 1969 to 1990.

Federal judicial service
On January 24, 1990, McKenna was nominated by President George H. W. Bush to a seat on the United States District Court for the Southern District of New York vacated by Judge William C. Conner. He was confirmed by the United States Senate on April 27, 1990, and received commission on April 30, 1990. He assumed senior status on May 24, 2002.

In 2001, McKenna struck down two policing policies introduced by Mayor Rudy Giuliani: he ruled that an instance in which the NYPD barred a church from allowing homeless people to sleep there was a violation of the Free Exercise Clause, and stopped the city from requiring a permit for vendors selling art or books in city parks.

Personal life and death
McKenna was married twice; first to Marie McEwen, who died in the 1990s, and then to Anita Favata, who died in 2006. He had four children from his first marriage.

McKenna died under hospice care in Brooklyn on February 3, 2023, at the age of 89.

References

Sources

1933 births
2023 deaths
20th-century American judges
20th-century American lawyers
21st-century American judges
Columbia Law School alumni
Fordham University alumni
Judges of the United States District Court for the Southern District of New York
Lawyers from New York City
People from Douglaston–Little Neck, Queens
Regis High School (New York City) alumni
Simpson Thacher & Bartlett
United States district court judges appointed by George H. W. Bush